Scoparia matuta is a moth in the family Crambidae. It was described by John Frederick Gates Clarke in 1965. It is found on the Juan Fernandez Archipelago in Chile.

References

Moths described in 1965
Scorparia
Endemic fauna of Chile